Syed Fadhil (born 16 April 1981) is a professional soccer player who plays for the Warriors FC in the S.League and the Singapore national football team.

He is a natural defensive midfielder.

Club career
Fadhil has previously played for S.League clubs Admiralty FC, Young Lions, Home United and Geylang United.

International career
He made his debut for the Singapore against North Korea on 7 February 2002.

International goals
Scores and results list Singapore's goal tally first.

Honours

Club

Geylang United
S.League: 2001

References

External links
data2.7m.cn

Singaporean footballers
Singapore international footballers
Living people
1981 births
Geylang International FC players
Home United FC players
Warriors FC players
Young Lions FC players
Singapore Premier League players
Association football midfielders